The Missouri Tigers football program is a college football team that represents the University of Missouri in the East Division of the Southeastern Conference (SEC) in the National Collegiate Athletic Association (NCAA). The team has had 31 head coaches since it started playing organized football in 1890 with the nickname Tigers. Missouri joined the Western Interstate University Football Association in December 1891, later winning the conference championship three years in a row. The conference disbanded after the 1897 season and Missouri remained independent until joining the Missouri Valley Intercollegiate Athletic Association in 1907. After several changes, the conference eventually became the Big Eight Conference. The Tigers became a charter member of the Big 12 in 1996 when the Big Eight disbanded. Missouri subsequently left the Big 12 following the 2011 season and joined as the 14th member of the SEC effective for the 2012 season. The Tigers have played 1,180 games during their 119 seasons. In those seasons, seven coaches have led Missouri to postseason bowl games: Don Faurot, Chauncey Simpson, Dan Devine, Al Onofrio, Warren Powers, Larry Smith, and Gary Pinkel. Nine coaches have also won conference championships with the Tigers: Harry Orman Robinson, C. D. Bliss, Bill Roper, Chester Brewer, John F. Miller, Gwinn Henry, Faurot, Simpson and Devine.

Faurot is the all-time leader in games coached (190) and years coached (19). Gary Pinkel is the all-time leader in wins (119). Roper has the highest winning percentage of any coach, with a percentage of .938 during his one year. Of coaches who served more than one season, James Phelan leads with a .813 winning percentage. Frank Carideo is, in terms of winning percentage, the worst coach the Tigers have had (.111). Onofrio and Smith have both been awarded coach of the year honors in their conference by the Associated Press. Of the 31 Tigers coaches, six have been inducted into the College Football Hall of Fame: Roper, Phelan, Faurot, Frank Broyles, Devine, and Pinkel. The current head coach is Eliah Drinkwitz.

Key

Coaches

Notes

References
General

Specific

Missouri
Missouri sports-related lists
University of Missouri-related lists